Events in the year 2013 in the Republic of India.

Incumbents

Governors

Events

January - March 
 3 to 7 January: 100th Indian Science Conference was organised in Kolkata by the Indian Science Congress Association.
 6 January: India–Pakistan border incidents begin. 
 12 January:Swami Vivekananda's 150th birth anniversary was celebrated. 
 14 January: Kumbh Mela begins in Allahabad. 
 26 January: Republic Day of India, Republic Day Parade was held in New Delhi with Bhutan's king Jigme Khesar Namgyel Wangchuck as Chief Guest.
 31 January to 3 February: 7th India Stone Mart 2013, a trade fair to promote the stone industry, was held in Jaipur. 
 12 February: Indian helicopter bribery scandal came to light. 
 15 February: 2012 DA14 asteroid passes by the Earth over eastern Indian Ocean.
 19 and 20 February: Nano India 2013, a science conference on nanotechnology, was held in Thiruvananthapuram. 
 21 February: Terror attacks on Hyderabad in Dilsukhnagar area. Two separate explosions killed 17 people.  
 26 February: Railway Budget 2013–14 presented by Minister of Railways, Pawan Bansal.
 28 February: 2013 Union budget of India presented by Finance Minister P. Chidambaram.
 8 March: Anti-Sri Lanka protests by Students Federation for Freedom of Tamil Eelam in Tamil Nadu started. 
 10 March: Kumbh Mela ends. An estimated 120 million pilgrims attended the festival. 
 13 March: Hizbul Mujahideen's attacks on Central Reserve Police Force at Bemina in Srinagar.
 19 March: Lok Sabha passes the Criminal Law (Amendment) Act, 2013. 
 20 March: BrahMos missile was test fired at Visakhapatnam.
 21 March: Rajya Sabha passes the Criminal Law (Amendment) Act, 2013. 
 27 March: Tamil Nadu Assembly Resolution on Sri Lanka for formation of Tamil Eelam and demands to the Centre to stop treating Sri Lanka as friendly nation.

April - June 
 2 April: President Pranab Mukherjee signed the Criminal Law (Amendment) Act, 2013. 
 15 April: Daulat Beg Oldi conflict between Indian and Chinese army patrols began.
8 May:Siddaramaih lead congress grabs a clear majority in Karnataka Legislative assembly winning 122 seats from total 224 seats. https://www.thehindu.com/news/national/karnataka/victory-in-karnataka-a-morale-booster-for-congress/article4695816.ece
10 May: Two Cabinet ministers, Ashwani Kumar and Pawan Bansal, resign after bribery allegations.
16 June - Janata Dal (United) quits from National Democratic Alliance led by Bharatiya Janata Party after seventeen years of association.
 Mid-June onwards: Flash floods in North India.

July - September 
 14 July: India shuts down its public telegram service.
 15 August: 67th Independence Day of India 
 26 August: Lok Sabha passes the National Food Security Bill, 2013
 28 August: The Indian rupee hits a 20 years record low of 68.8450 against the US dollar.
 2 September: Rajya Sabha passes the National Food Security Bill, 2013 
 4 September: Raghuram Rajan took over as the 23rd Governor of the Reserve Bank of India. 
 13 September: Narendra Modi declared Bharatiya Janata Party's prime ministerial candidate for 2014 Indian general election. 
 13 September: The sentences for convicts in the 2012 Delhi gang rape case was announced. 
 30 September: Former Bihar Chief Minister Lalu Prasad Yadav convicted in the Fodder scam case.

October - December 
 12 October: Cyclone Phailin makes landfall in Odisha.
 2–3 November: Diwali. 
 5 November: The Mars Orbiter Mission (MOM), was successfully launched into low Earth orbit by the Indian Space Research Organisation (ISRO).
 14 November: Sachin Tendulkar retired from International Cricket.
 19 November 2013: Bharatiya Mahila Bank, India's first all-women commercial bank, starts its operations.
 9 December: The Sexual Harassment of Women at Workplace (Prevention, Prohibition and Redressal) Act, 2013 came into effect after being approved by Ministry of Women and Child Development.
 11 December: Supreme Court of India reinstated same-sex relationships as an offence under Section 377 of the Indian Penal Code.  
 12 December: Indian diplomat Devyani Khobragade was arrested in New York, triggering a diplomatic row between India and the US. 
 18 December: The Lokpal and Lokayuktas Bill, 2013 was passed by the Rajya Sabha.

Others

 National income - 112,335,216 million

 Summer: Droughts in Maharashtra surpasses the previous worst famine record of 1972. The droughts were caused by low rainfall in June to October 2012. 
 January–March: The Indian economy grew at a rate of 4.8% in the January–March quarter of the 2012–13 fiscal year. 
 April–June: The GDP showed a 4.4% growth in the first quarter of the 2013–2014 fiscal year. 
 July–September: The GDP grew at 4.8% in the second quarter of the 2013–2014 fiscal year.

Transport and infrastructure

January
 20 January: A new airport terminal was inaugurated by the President Pranab Mukherjee at Netaji Subhas Chandra Bose International Airport, Kolkata

July
 Mumbai Monorail has test journeys between Wadala and Chembur.

November

 Larsen and Toubro began laying tracks for the Hyderabad Metro rail. 
 14 November: Rapid Metro Gurgaon has started its operation.

December
 Land acquisition for Hyderabad Metro completed.

Cinema

 3 May: Indian cinema completes 100 years. The first Indian silent film Raja Harishchandra was released in 1913.

Bollywood

Sandalwood

Malayalam

Marathi

Tamil cinema

Tollywood

Sports

January
 2013 Aircel Chennai Open from 31 December 2012 to 6 January 2013.
18-29 January:2013 Lusophony Games to be held in Margao, Goa.
 31 January: 2013 Women's Cricket World Cup begin in Mumbai.

February
 14–21 February: 2013 South Asian Games in Delhi.
 17 February: 2013 Women's Cricket World Cup finals.
 18–24 February: 2013 World Hockey League Round 2 Men (Delhi leg) and 2013 World Hockey League Round 2 Women (Delhi leg).

April
 2 April: 2013 Indian Premier League opening ceremony was held at Salt Lake Stadium or Yuva Bharati Krirangan in Kolkata.
 3 April: 2013 Indian Premier League season begin.

May
 26 May: 2013 Indian Premier League finals. Mumbai Indians won the series in 6th season of IPL by defeating Chennai SuperKings.

June 

 23 June - India win the 2013 ICC Champions Trophy by defeating hosts England in the finals.

July
 3–7 July: 2013 Asian Athletics Championship continental tournament, winner China with 15 gold medals.

September
 29 September: India beat Malaysia 3–0 to win Sultan of Johor Cup (Under 21).

October
 27 October: 2013 Indian Grand Prix at Buddh International Circuit, Greater Noida.

November
 6 – 26 November: World Chess Championship 2013 to be held in Chennai.

December
 1–14 December: 2013 Kabaddi World Cup was to be held in India. Host city is Bathinda.
 6–15 December: 2013 Men's Hockey Junior World Cup held in New Delhi, India.

Unknown
 2012–13 I-League end date.
 2013 Federation Cup held in Srinagar, Kashmir.
 2013–14 I-League begin date.

Publications
 “Body Offering” by Makarand Paranjape

 “Kalahandi” by Tapan Kumar Pradhan

 “The Accidental Apprentice” by Vikas Swarup

 “The Oath of the Vayuputras” by Amish Tripathi

 “Tiger by the Trail” by Venita Coelho

Deaths

January

 3 January – M. S. Gopalakrishnan, violinist.
 3 January – Shikaripura Ranganatha Rao, archaeologist.
 3 January – Sekhar Sinha, cricketer, cancer.
 4 January – Salik Lucknawi, Urdu poet.
 5 January – Haradhan Bandopadhyay, Indian actor.
 5 January – K. B. Mallappa, Indian politician, MLA for Arkalgud in the Karnataka Legislative Assembly (1977–1989).

February

March

 11 March – Teja Narla, Indian child actor (born 1996)
 11 March – Sripada Pinakapani, Carnatic Vocalist (born 3 August 1913) .

April

 14 April – P. B. Sreenivas, Telugu Legendary singer
 21 April – Shakuntala Devi, Great Mathematician
 23 April – Shamshad Begum, Pioneering playback singer (Born 1919)
 22 April – JS Verma – 27th Chief Justice of India

May
 30 May – Rituparno Ghosh, Renowned Bengali Director
 31 May – Abir Goswami, actor

June
 3 June – Jiah Khan, actress
 20 June – Dicky Rutnagur, journalist (born 1931)
 22 June – Soccor Velho, footballer (born 1983)

July
 4 July - Satish Tare, Marathi actor

 12 July – Pran, Actor (born 1920)
 18 July - Vaali, Writer and poet (born 1931)
 28 July- Jagdish Raj, actor

October
 9 October – Srihari, Actor (Born on 15 August 1964)
 24 October – Manna Dey, Legendary Singer (b.1919)
 28 October – Rajendra Yadav, Writer (Born on 28 August 1929)

November
 10 November – Vijaydan Detha, Writer (Born on 1 September 1926)
 17 November – Om Prakash Valmiki, Writer (Born on 30 June 1950)

December
 27 December – Farooq Sheikh, actor (born 25 March 1948)

See also 

 2012 in India
 2011 in India
 2010 in India
 2013 in Indian sports

References

 
Years of the 21st century in India